Sergei Vladimirovich Nyukhalov (born 30 May 1986) is a former Russian professional football player.

Club career
He played in the Russian Football National League for FC Chita in 2009.

External links
 
 

1986 births
Living people
Russian footballers
Association football defenders
FC Tekstilshchik Ivanovo players
FC Akzhayik players
Kazakhstan Premier League players
Russian expatriate footballers
Expatriate footballers in Kazakhstan
FC Chita players
FC Sportakademklub Moscow players